The Nanchang–Jiujiang high-speed railway is a high-speed railway currently under construction in Jiangxi Province, China. It is part of the Beijing–Hong Kong (Taipei) corridor.

The line runs roughly parallel to the Nanchang–Jiujiang intercity railway, but on a faster  alignment.

History
A feasibility study for the line was approved in February 2021. Construction started on 21 November 2022. It is expected to be completed by 2027.

Stations

References

High-speed railway lines in China
High-speed railway lines under construction